Frank Dennis Saylor IV (born July 3, 1955) is the Chief United States district judge of the United States District Court for the District of Massachusetts and was formerly a Judge on the United States Foreign Intelligence Surveillance Court.

Biography

Early life and education
Born in Royal Oak, Michigan, Saylor received a Bachelor of Science degree from Northwestern University in 1977 and a Juris Doctor from Harvard Law School in 1981.

Career
He was in private practice at Goodwin Procter in Boston, from 1981 to 1987, and from 1993 to 2004. He was an Assistant United States Attorney for the District of Massachusetts from 1987 to 1990. He was a special counsel and chief of staff to Robert Mueller, the assistant attorney general of the Criminal Division, United States Department of Justice, Washington, D.C. from 1990 to 1993.

Saylor represented Circor International, Inc., KF Industries, Inc., and senior company officials as a criminal defense attorney while those companies were under investigation for smuggling Chinese-manufactured valves and selling the valves as a product of the U.S. between 2001 and 2004. The U.S. Attorney for the Southern District of Texas, Michael T. Shelby, dismissed the investigation days after Saylor was confirmed by the Senate.

Federal judicial service

On July 30, 2003, Saylor was nominated by President George W. Bush to a seat on the United States District Court for the District of Massachusetts vacated by Robert Keeton. Saylor was confirmed by the United States Senate on June 1, 2004, and received his commission on June 2, 2004. He also served a 2011–2018 term on the FISA Court. Saylor became Chief Judge on January 1, 2020.

References

Sources

1955 births
Living people
Northwestern University alumni
Harvard Law School alumni
Judges of the United States District Court for the District of Massachusetts
United States district court judges appointed by George W. Bush
21st-century American judges
People from Royal Oak, Michigan
Assistant United States Attorneys
Judges of the United States Foreign Intelligence Surveillance Court